is a Japanese lake monster said to be living in Hokkaidō's Lake Kussharo. The naming convention was likely borrowed from that of Loch Ness's Nessie.

See also
Issie

References

Lakes of Hokkaido
Japanese legendary creatures
Water monsters